The 1994 European Parliament election in Ireland was the Irish component of the 1994 European Parliament election. The election was conducted under the single transferable vote. Local elections were held on the same day for borough councils, urban district councils and town commissioners.

The Campaign 
In 1992, a general election in Ireland led to the Labour Party's best results to date, paving the way for Dick Spring to lead his party into coalition with Fianna Fáil.  The 1994 local and European elections were seen in some quarters as a mid-term report on that coalition's performance. The strong result by the Green Party in particular was interpreted as a warning that left-leaning middle class voters were moving away from Labour.

The election was notable for how some parties ran "parachute candidates" (like Orla Guerin for Labour) who did not resonate with voters as well as incumbent, grassroots campaigners.

The popularity of President Mary Robinson led to parties presenting more female candidates than usual, four of whom became MEPs on this occasion.

Results

MEPs elected

Voting details

See also
List of members of the European Parliament for Ireland, 1994–99 – List ordered by constituency

References

External links
ElectionsIreland.org – 1994 European Parliament (Ireland) election results

1994 in Irish politics
Ireland
European 1994
Euro